Boutique Air serves the following destinations:

Former destinations

References

Travel
Airlines based in California
Airlines of the United States
Regional airlines of the United States